The Federal budget 2016–17 is the federal budget of Pakistan for the fiscal year beginning from 1 July 2016 and ending on 30 June 2017. The budget was presented in the Parliament by the Minister of Finance, Ishaq Dar on June 3, 2015.

References 

Nawaz Sharif administration
federal budget
Pakistani budgets
Pakistan federal budget
Pakistan federal budget
2016 in Pakistani politics
2017 in Pakistani politics